musikcube is a free and open-source cross-platform, terminal-based audio player software and streaming server.

Features
musikcube is based on a modular plug-in architecture, and uses plug-ins written in C++. Plug-ins provide core functionality for audio decoding, data streaming, output device handling, metadata parsing, digital signal processing, and more. Plugins currently exist to provide support for many popular audio codecs, including MP3, M4A, Ogg Vorbis, and FLAC.

Internally, musikcube uses the SQLite database library for storing track and playlist metadata.

There is currently no support for Digital rights management.

musikcube is capable of streaming audio via an integrated server. An Android client also exists, allowing music to be streamed over local and wide-area networks.

Licensing
musikcube (and official plugins) are licensed under the BSD-3-Clause license.

See also 

cmus
Music Player Daemon
Music on Console
Comparison of audio player software

External links

Free software programmed in C++
Linux media players
Windows media players
Free media players
2004 software
Software that uses ncurses
Software using the BSD license